Desmond Lloyd Ashby (born 15 February 1931) is a former New Zealand rugby union player. A fullback, Ashby represented  at a provincial level, scoring what was at that time a record 328 points for the union. He played one match for the New Zealand national side, the All Blacks, a test against the touring Australian team in 1958. He later served as a selector for the Eastern Southland sub-union in 1961, and coached the Kaikorai club side in Dunedin in 1979. Ashby is an uncle of former All Black halfback Justin Marshall.

References

1931 births
Living people
People from Mataura
People educated at Aurora College (Invercargill)
New Zealand rugby union players
New Zealand international rugby union players
Southland rugby union players
Rugby union fullbacks
New Zealand rugby union coaches